George Rushout, 3rd Baron Northwick (30 August 1811 – 11 November 1887), was a British Conservative politician.

Background
Northwick was the son of George Rushout-Bowles, younger son of John Rushout, 1st Baron Northwick. His mother was Lady Caroline, daughter of John Stewart, 7th Earl of Galloway.  He was born at Burford, Shropshire where his father was then parish Rector.

He was educated at Harrow School and entered Christ Church, Oxford in 1829, graduating as BA in 1833 and MA in 1836.

Political career
Rushout was returned to Parliament for Evesham in 1837. In May 1838 he fought a duel with Peter Borthwick, who had been elected alongside Northwick in 1837 but had been unseated on petition in March 1838, over the election results. He continued to represent Evesham until 1841, and later sat as Member of Parliament for Worcestershire East between 1847 and 1859. The latter year he succeeded his uncle in the barony and to Northwick Park, Gloucestershire  and entered the House of Lords.

Military Career and Other Interests
Rushout was commissioned Cornet in the 1st Life Guards in 1833, was promoted Lieutenant in 1837 and Major in 1842, retiring from the army in the latter year.

Lord Northwick was in later life governor of Harrow School and Cheltenham College.

Family
Lord Northwick married Elizabeth Augusta, daughter of William Bateman-Hanbury, 1st Baron Bateman and widow of George Drought Warburton, in 1869. There were no surviving children from the marriage, an only child, a daughter Caroline, dying aged eight in 1878. On 23 January 1886 the couple, then married sixteen years, were awarded the prize of the Dunmow Flitch, "receiving it privately and without the customary forms".

Lord Northwick died at the Queen's Hotel, Upper Norwood, Surrey in November 1887, aged 76, when his titles became extinct. Lady Northwick died in May 1912, aged 80.

See also
Politics of the United Kingdom

References

External links 

1811 births
1887 deaths
3
Conservative Party (UK) MPs for English constituencies
UK MPs 1837–1841
UK MPs 1841–1847
UK MPs 1847–1852
UK MPs 1852–1857
UK MPs 1857–1859
UK MPs who inherited peerages
People educated at Harrow School
Alumni of Christ Church, Oxford